Marco Alexandru Dulca (born 11 May 1999) is a Romanian professional footballer who plays as a midfielder for Liga I club Chindia Târgoviște.

Club career
Dulca started practising football with Universitatea Cluj at age five, and remained at the club for more than a decade before joining the academy of Swansea City in 2015. He returned to Romania four years later by signing for Viitorul Constanța, where he recorded his senior debut in a 3–2 Liga I victory over Hermannstadt on 28 July 2019.

On 30 August 2020, Dulca was loaned out to fellow league team Chindia Târgoviște. He scored his first career goal in a 2–2 home draw with Argeș Pitești on 19 December, and totalled 33 matches in all competitions during the 2020–21 season. During the summer of 2021, Dulca joined Chindia Târgoviște on a permanent basis as part of a swap deal.

On 5 August 2022, FCSB officially announced the signing of Dulca after diverting him from his way to 1899 Hoffenheim and meeting his €200,000 release clause. He made his debut the following day in a 1–1 league draw at Mioveni.

International career
Dulca represented the Romania national under-23 team in the 2020 Summer Olympics in Japan, starting in all three games of the group-stage exit.

Personal life
Dulca was born in Pohang, South Korea, where his father Cristian was playing for Pohang Steelers. The latter was also a professional footballer and was part of the Romania squad for the 1998 FIFA World Cup.

In 2021, it was reported that Dulca started dating Mihaela Buzărnescu, a Romanian tennis player 11 years his senior. They ended their relationship the following year, after she accused him of emotional abuse.

Career statistics

Club

Honours
Viitorul Constanța
Supercupa României: 2019

References

External links

Marco Dulca at Liga Profesionistă de Fotbal 

1999 births
Living people
People from Pohang
Sportspeople from Cluj-Napoca
Romanian footballers
Association football midfielders
Liga I players
FC Viitorul Constanța players
AFC Chindia Târgoviște players
FC Steaua București players
Romania youth international footballers
Romania under-21 international footballers
Olympic footballers of Romania
Footballers at the 2020 Summer Olympics